Scotina is a genus of sac spiders of the family Liocranidae which was named by the German zoologist Franz Anton Menge in 1873 with Scotina gracilipes as the type species. Scotina was thought to be a mainly Western Palearctic genus but one species, Scotina palliardi was found in Korea in 2011.  The species in the genus Scotina are small spiders which have six to ten pairs of ventral spines which can be seen using a lens. They have a darker and shinier cephalothorax than in other genera within the Liocranidae. They also have light brown femora with the more distal segments of the legs are darker, especially on the first pairs. They are terrestrial spiders which are mainly found among moss and litter on the ground.

Species

Four species are currently listed as valid in the World Spider Catalog.

Scotina celans (Blackwall, 1841) – Europe, Algeria, Russia
Scotina gracilipes (Blackwall, 1859) – Europe
Scotina occulta Kritscher, 1996 – Malta

Scotina palliardii (L. Koch, 1881) – Europe, Russia, Korea

References

Spiders of Asia
Araneomorphae genera